This is a list of films which placed number-one at the weekend box office in Brazil during 2017. Amounts are in Brazilian reais.

References

2017 in Brazil
2017
Brazil